Sang-e Kartu (also Romanized as Sang-e Kārtū) is a village in Sarduiyeh Rural District, Sarduiyeh District, Jiroft County, Kerman Province, Iran. At the 2006 census, its population was 32, divided into 8 families.

References 

Populated places in Jiroft County